Boris Artaud (born 26 May 1990) is a French sport shooter.

He participated at the 2018 ISSF World Shooting Championships, winning a medal.

References

External links

Living people
1990 births
French male sport shooters
ISSF pistol shooters
Sportspeople from Marseille
Universiade gold medalists for France
Universiade medalists in shooting
Medalists at the 2013 Summer Universiade
21st-century French people